The Caatinga enclaves moist forests is an ecoregion of the Tropical moist forests  Biome, and the South American Atlantic Forest biome. It is located in northeastern Brazil.

The ecoregion forms a series of discontinuous, island-like enclaves amongst the much larger and dry Caatinga xeric shrubland and thorn forests ecoregion and Cerrado subtropical savannas ecoregion.

Setting
The enclaves are found mostly on four major regional plateaus, the Chapada do Araripe, Serra de Ibiapaba, Serra de Baturité, and Serra da Borborema. The enclaves are found on windward slopes and plateaus between  elevation.

Flora
The forest is generally similar in composition to the primary Atlantic Forests further east, but includes species from the Caatinga, Cerrado, and Amazon Rainforest as well.

The emergent and canopy layers are made up mostly of tree species of the families Fabaceae (Peltophorum dubium), Meliaceae (Cedrela fissilis) and Apocynaceae (Aspidosperma parvifolium).

Fauna
Fauna associated with this habitat shows a strong connection with both the Amazon Rainforest and the Atlantic Forest, and, to a lesser degree, the Caatinga.

Animals associated with this habitat include birds such as the grey-breasted parakeet (Pyrrhura griseipectus), ochraceous piculet (Picumnus limae), Ceará gnateater (Conopophaga lineata cearae) and Araripe manakin (Antilophia bokermanni), frogs such as Adelophryne baturitensis and A. maranguapensis, and lizards such as Mabuya arajara and Leposoma baturitensis.

In contrast to other groups, only a single species of mammal is endemic to these moist forests enclaves, the recently described Cariri climbing mouse (Rhipidomys cariri).

Conservation
Most birds endemic to these moist forests enclaves are considered threatened, primarily due to habitat loss, by BirdLife International and, consequently, IUCN. In general the status of other animals is comparably poorly known, but likely to be similar to that of the birds.

See also
Caatinga xeric shrubland and thorn forests
List of plants of Atlantic Forest vegetation of Brazil 
Ecoregions of the Atlantic Forest biome
List of ecoregions in Brazil

References

External links
 

Atlantic Forest
Neotropical tropical and subtropical moist broadleaf forests
Ecoregions of Brazil
Environment of Ceará
Forests of Brazil
.
Geography of Ceará